New Switzerland is an unincorporated community in Habersham County, in the U.S. state of Georgia.

History
A post office called New Switzerland was established in 1882, and remained in operation until 1889. The community was named after Switzerland, the native land of a large share of the first settlers.

References

Swiss-American history
Unincorporated communities in Habersham County, Georgia
Unincorporated communities in Georgia (U.S. state)